Since the rebranding of the UEFA Women's Cup to UEFA Women's Champions League in 2009, 58 players from 23 countries have scored three goals (a hat-trick) or more in a single match on a total of 88 occasions for 29 different clubs from 13 different leagues. The first player to achieve this feat was Kim Little, who scored four times for Arsenal in a 9–0 victory over PAOK on 30 September 2009.

Fourteen players have scored four or more goals in a match; of these, only Inka Grings and Ada Hegerberg have achieved this more than once. Only Grings and Cathrine Paaske Sørensen have scored five goals in a single match. Hegerberg have scored three or more goals on six occasions in the Champions League, more than any other player, followed by Anja Mittag, who have scored four hat-tricks.

Eugénie Le Sommer holds the record for the fastest hat-trick, netting three times for Lyon against Romanian club Olimpia Cluj in seven minutes on 28 September 2011. The youngest scorer of a hat-trick is Magdalena Mayr, who netted three times for Bayern Munich against Viktória Szombathely, aged 17 years and 16 days, on 7 October 2009. The oldest player to score a hat-trick is Patrizia Panico, who was 37 years and 266 days old when she scored three goals for Torres on 31 October 2012 against Olimpia Cluj.

Hat-tricks

As of 21 December 2022

Multiple hat-tricks
The following table lists the number of hat-tricks scored by players who have scored two or more hat-tricks. Boldface indicates a player who is currently active.

See also
 List of UEFA Champions League hat-tricks
 List of UEFA Women's Cup and UEFA Women's Champions League records and statistics

References

External links
Main round hat-tricks on weltfussball.de
Qualifying round hat-tricks on weltfussball.de

UEFA Women's Champions League
hat-tricks
Women's association football records and statistics